ISO 3166-2:NL is the entry for the Kingdom of the Netherlands in ISO 3166-2, part of the ISO 3166 standard published by the International Organization for Standardization (ISO), which defines codes for the names of the principal subdivisions (e.g., provinces or states) of all countries coded in ISO 3166-1.

Currently for the kingdom, ISO 3166-2 codes are defined for 3 countries, 12 provinces and 3 special municipalities.

The kingdom consists of the 3 countries + the country of the Netherlands which is composed of the provinces and the special municipalities.

Each code consists of two parts, separated by a hyphen. The second part either of the following:
 two letters: provinces or countries
 two letters and a digit: special municipalities

Current codes
Subdivision names are listed as in the ISO 3166-2 standard published by the ISO 3166 Maintenance Agency (ISO 3166/MA).

ISO 639-1 codes are used to represent subdivision names in the following administrative languages:
 (nl): Dutch
 (fy): West Frisian

Provinces

 Notes

Countries and special municipalities
Besides being included as subdivisions of the Netherlands in ISO 3166-2, the countries and special municipalities are also officially assigned their own country codes in ISO 3166-1.

Changes
The following changes to the entry have been announced in newsletters by the ISO 3166/MA since the first publication of ISO 3166-2 in 1998:

See also
 Subdivisions of the Netherlands
 FIPS region codes of the Netherlands
 NUTS codes of the Netherlands

References

External links
 ISO Online Browsing Platform: NL
 Provinces of Netherlands, Statoids.com

2:NL
ISO 3166-2
Netherlands geography-related lists
Dutch Caribbean